Davit Gogichaishvili (born  August 18, 1981) is Georgian Economist, who has served as Deputy Auditor General of Georgia since October 2017.

Working Experience

Ltd. Geo Farm Holding — Co-Founder and CEO  (2017); Khareba LLC — Diredctor  (2017); JSC TBC Bank — Head of Problem Loans and Assets Management Department (2011–2016), Senior Corporate Recovery Manager (2009-2011),  Corporate Finance Analyst  (2008-2009); Agricom LTD — Financial Director (2007-2008) Director (2005-2007); Georgian Industrial Company LTD — Financial Advisor (2006-2007); Agrosystems LTD — Deputy Chief Accountant (2004-2005);  Georgian Railway LTD — Economist (2004).

Education

Georgian Federation of Professional Accountants and Auditors, Association of Chartered Certified Accountants (ACCA) Program (2003-2004);  Tbilisi State University — MSc, Economics (2002-2004);  Tbilisi State University, BSc, Economics (1998-2002); Georgian State Agrarian University — BSc, Food Technology (1998-2002).

Besides native Georgian, speaks English and Russian languages.

References

External links
Biography at State Audit Office website

1981 births
Living people
People from Tbilisi
Economists from Georgia (country)
Tbilisi State University alumni
Recipients of the Presidential Order of Excellence